Henry William Poor (June 16, 1844 – April 13, 1915) was an American banker, stockbroker, and author.

Biography

Early life
Henry William Poor was born in Bangor, Maine in 1844, the son of Henry Varnum Poor. The family moved to New York City when he was five years old, and he spent his youth there. He attended Harvard College, graduating in 1865. The firm that he and his father established in 1868, H. V. & H. W. Poor, was a predecessor to the business that eventually became Standard & Poor's.

He married Constance Evelyn Brandon on February 4, 1880, and they had five children.

Career
He became prominent as a stockbroker and investor, but had to liquidate his business in 1908 following some major losses.

He was also widely known as a book collector and a patron of the arts.

Death
He died in New York City on April 13, 1915.

References

External links
 Gilding the Gilded Age: Interior Decoration Tastes & Trends in New York City A collaboration between The Frick Collection and The William Randolph Hearst Archive at LIU Post.

Writers from Bangor, Maine
1844 births
1915 deaths
Businesspeople from Maine
Stockbrokers
Harvard College alumni
19th-century American businesspeople